Ivan Fileš (born 23 April 1961) is a retired professional footballer who played for clubs in former Yugoslavia and France.

Club career
In the 1983–84 season, after a good display in Varteks jersey previous season, he was  signed by Yugoslav powerhouse Red Star Belgrade but he did not make a single appearance in the league so he left for Zenica where he stayed for the next five years and became an integral part of Čelik's team that got promoted and remained in top flight.

External links
  article in Slobodna Dalmacija
  stats in France
  at Red Star page

1961 births
Living people
Sportspeople from Čakovec
Association football midfielders
Yugoslav footballers
NK Varaždin players
NK Čelik Zenica players
En Avant Guingamp players
Yugoslav Second League players
Yugoslav First League players
Ligue 2 players
Yugoslav expatriate footballers
Expatriate footballers in France
Yugoslav expatriate sportspeople in France